Penny Crissman (born November 20, 1943) is an American politician who served in the Michigan House of Representatives from the 45th district from 1993 to 1998.

References

1943 births
Living people
Republican Party members of the Michigan House of Representatives
Women state legislators in Michigan
20th-century American politicians
20th-century American women politicians
21st-century American women